A human skin mask is a mask made of human skin, and may refer to:

 The skin masks made by Ed Gein
 Dead Skin Mask, a song in the album Seasons in the Abyss by the thrash metal band Slayer, about Ed Gein
 The masks worn by Leatherface in the film The Texas Chainsaw Massacre
 Human skin masks often referenced in Wuxia fiction

Other appearances of the concept include:
 The synthetic mask used by Jeffrey Hatrix
 An Ekoi mask featured in the section Human Skin Mask of the second episode of the third season of Ripley's Believe It or Not!
 A set of masks that Marilyn Manson was accused of buying
 A mask that appeared on a short-lived promotional poster for the film Hannibal
 The masks in Game of Thrones used by Faceless Men from Braavos
 The face of a guard used by Hannibal Lecter in Silence of the Lambs

See also 
 Skin mask (disambiguation)